Piscataquis can refer to:
Piscataquis River, in Maine, United States
Piscataquis County, Maine, United States

See also:
Piscataqua River, Maine/New Hampshire, United States